Manoj is an Indian film editor who works primarily in Malayalam cinema. In 2015, he won the Kerala State Film Award for Best Editor for Ivide.

Selected filmography
 Smart City (2006)
 Madambi (2008)
 Crazy Gopalan (2008)
 Of the People (2008)
 Ivar Vivahitharayal...? (2009)
 Kerala Cafe (2009)
 Happy Husbands (2010)
 Nayakan (2010)
 Pramani (2010)
 Marykkundoru Kunjaadu (2010)
 The Thriller (2010)
 Nadakame Ulakam (2011)
 Teja Bhai & Family (2011)
 Kunjaliyan (2011)
 Venicile Vyapari (2011)
 Husbands in Goa (2012)
 Grandmaster (2012)
 Friday (2012)
 Akasathinte Niram (2012)
 Nee Ko Njaa Cha (2013)
 Amen (2013)
 Pakida (2014)
 1983 (2014)
 Law Point (2014)
 Mr. Fraud (2014)
 Money Ratnam (2014)
 Angry Babies in Love (2014)
 Double Barrel (2015)
 Ivide (2015)
 KL 10 Patthu (2015)
 Lukka Chuppi (2015)
 Action Hero Biju (2016)
 Ayal Njanalla (2015)
 Tiyaan (2017)
 Adam Joan (2017)
 Street Lights (2018)
KA (2019) 
Chathurmugam 2020
Mahaveeryar (2022)
 19(1)(a) (2022)
Christopher (2023)
Love jihad (2022)Post Production

References

External links
 

Living people
Malayalam film editors
Place of birth missing (living people)
Year of birth missing (living people)
Film editors from Kerala